Zinc finger E-box-binding homeobox 1 is a protein that in humans is encoded by the ZEB1 gene.

ZEB1 (previously known as TCF8) encodes a zinc finger and homeodomain transcription factor that represses T-lymphocyte-specific IL2 gene expression by binding to a negative regulatory domain 100 nucleotides 5-prime of the IL2 transcription start site. ZEB1 and its mammalian paralog ZEB2 belongs to the Zeb family within the ZF (zinc finger) class of homeodomain transcription factors. ZEB1 protein has 7 zinc fingers and 1 homeodomain. The structure of the homeodomain is shown on the right.

Clinical significance 
Mutations of the gene are linked to posterior polymorphous corneal dystrophy 3. ZEB1 downregulates E-cadherin and induces epithelial to mesenchymal transition in breast and other carcinomas A recent study suggested its contributing role in lung cancer invasiveness and metastasis development. Overexpression of ZEB1 has been identified as a potential risk factor for recurrence and poor prognosis in several types of cancers.

References

Further reading

External links 
 

Transcription factors